Matthew O'Rourke (born 25 February 1967) is a New Zealand former cricketer. He played one first-class match for Auckland in 1991/92.

See also
 List of Auckland representative cricketers

References

External links
 

1967 births
Living people
New Zealand cricketers
Auckland cricketers
Cricketers from Masterton